Uber BV v Aslam [2021] UKSC 5 is a landmark case in UK labour law and company law on employment rights. The UK Supreme Court held the transport corporation, Uber, must pay its drivers the national living wage, and at least 28 days paid holidays, from the time that drivers log onto the Uber app, and are willing and able to work. The Supreme Court decision was unanimous, and upheld the Court of Appeal, Employment Appeal Tribunal, and Employment Tribunal. The Supreme Court, and all courts below, left open whether the drivers are also employees (and entitled further to unfair dismissal, National Insurance contributions, and employer arrangement of income tax) but indicated that the criteria for employment status was fulfilled, given Uber's control over drivers.

However, while the question of whether Uber drivers may also be employees may have been left open, the obstacle which must be overcome in any claim wishing to establish limb-a status is the employment tribunal's decision in Smith v Pimlico where the employment tribunal decided that Mr Smith was not an employee on the basis that it considered all the circumstances including the fact that the Claimant took advantage of his self employed status, that there was insufficient obligation to provide work or pay and undertook the financial risk of non payment by the client for this relationship to be one of employer and employee. This part of the decision was upheld by the EAT which dismissed the claimant’s cross appeal in this regard. This is only one of the most recent instances of a long history of cases where the courts fail to find an employer-employee relationship due to lack of mutuality of obligation.

On 16 March 2021, Uber indicated that it intended to violate the Supreme Court ruling, by only paying drivers the minimum wage while driving, not when being available for work as the Supreme Court required.

Facts
Yaseen Aslam and James Farrar are founders of App Drivers & Couriers Union App Drivers & Couriers Union and the lead claimants represented by Bates Wells Solicitors alongside a number of drivers, claimed that they should be paid the minimum wage under the National Minimum Wage Act 1998 and receive paid annual leave under the Working Time Regulations 1998 while working as drivers for Uber. Uber BV, a Dutch incorporated subsidiary of Uber, argued that their drivers were self-employed independent contractors, and that it owed them no worker or employee obligations. Its contracts described the drivers as "partners" and stated that "nothing shall create an employment relationship between Uber and the partner". The drivers argued that this was a sham. Under the Employment Rights Act 1996 section 230 (and equivalent sections in the National Minimum Wage Act 1998) a "worker" who is entitled to the minimum wage or paid holidays is anyone (a) with a contract of employment or (b) anyone who personally performs work but not for a client or customer. The drivers contended they were workers (without specifying which type).

Judgment

Employment tribunal
The employment tribunal unanimously held that the drivers were "workers" within the definition in section 230(3)(b) of the Employment Rights Act 1996, and were thus entitled to the minimum wage and holiday pay. The tribunal did not specify whether the claimants were also employees.

As to Uber's tactics in pursuing its case, the Tribunal observed:

The Tribunal gave the following reasons for arriving at its decision:

An organisation resorting in its documentation to fictions, twisted language and even brand new terminology, merited a degree of scepticism.
There were many things said and written in the name of Uber in unguarded moments, which reinforce the Claimants' simple case that the organisation runs a transportation business and employs the drivers to that end.
It is unreal to deny that Uber is in business as a supplier of transportation services.
Uber's general case and the written terms on which they rely do not correspond with the practical reality.
The logic of Uber's case became all the more difficult as it was developed.
It was not real to regard Uber as working "for" the drivers and that the only sensible interpretation is that the relationship was the other way around.
The drivers fell full square within the terms of the 1996 Act, s 230(3)(b).
The guidance in the principal authorities favoured the conclusion.
The authorities relied upon by Uber's counsel did not support the conclusion for which he argued.
The terms on which Uber rely do not correspond with the reality of the relationship between the organisation and the drivers. Accordingly, the Tribunal is free to disregard them.
None of the above reasoning should be taken as doubting that the Respondents could have devised a business model not involving them employing drivers. The Tribunal found only that the model which they chose failed to achieve that aim.

Employment Appeal Tribunal
The Employment Appeal Tribunal dismissed the appeal on 10 November 2017. In her ruling, HHJ Eady stated:

Court of Appeal
The majority of the Court of Appeal (Sir Terence Etherton MR and Bean LJ) upheld the Employment Appeal Tribunal decision, so that Uber drivers are workers entitled to the minimum wage and paid holidays. The joint majority judgment said the following:

Underhill LJ dissented, saying the following.

Supreme Court
The Supreme Court held unanimously that the Employment Tribunal had been correct, and that the drivers for Uber were "workers", entitled at least to the minimum wage and paid holidays, calculated from the time that they log onto the Uber app. The Supreme Court, like the courts below, did not directly address whether the drivers were also employees, although it indicated that Uber strongly controls the nature of the work drivers do. The contracts drafted by Uber, which classified the drivers as independent contractors, did not reflect the reality of the relationship, taking into account the purpose of employment rights, and inequality of bargaining power that statutory rights were intended to correct. The judgment was held to be enforceable against Uber London Ltd, therefore bypassing the assertion by Uber that its Dutch incorporation, Uber BV, was responsible.

Lord Leggatt (with whom Lord Reed, Lord Hodge, Lady Arden, Lord Sales and Lord Hamblen agreed) gave judgment.

See also

United Kingdom labour law
Employment contract in English law

References

External links
 

Supreme Court of the United Kingdom cases
United Kingdom labour case law
BV v Aslam